The TAS classification can be used to assign names to many common types of volcanic rocks based upon the relationships between the combined alkali content and the silica content. These chemical parameters are useful, because the relative proportions of alkalis and silica play an important role in determining actual mineralogy and normative mineralogy. The classification appears to be and can be simple to use for rocks that have been chemically analyzed. Except for the following quotation from Johannsen (1937), this entry is based upon Le Maitre and others (2002).

Use of the TAS classification
TAS stands for Total Alkali Silica.

Before using the TAS or any other classification, however, the following words of Johannsen (1937) should be kept in mind.
Many and peculiar are the classifications that have been proposed for igneous rocks. Their variability depends in part upon the purpose for which each was intended, and in part upon the difficulties arising from the characters of the rocks themselves. The trouble is not with the classifications but with nature which did not make things right. …  Rocks must be classified in order to compare them with others, previously described, of similar composition and appearance. If this cannot be done on a genetic basis, then an artificial system must answer in order to serve as a card index to rock descriptions. Although this may be an evil thing, it is, at least, the least of several evils.
The subtitle of the classification chapter by Johannsen (1937) is "Chacun a son goût" (to each his own taste).

Furthermore, as discussed in considerable detail by Le Maitre and others (2002), the classification cannot be applied to all volcanic rocks. Certain rocks cannot be named using the diagram. For others, additional chemical, mineralogic, or textural criteria must be used, as for lamprophyres.

The TAS classification should be applied only to rocks for which the mineral mode cannot be determined (otherwise, use a scheme based on mineralogy, such as the QAPF diagram or one of the other diagrams presented in the entry for igneous rocks). Before classifying rocks using the TAS diagram, the chemical analyses must be recalculated to 100% excluding water and carbon dioxide.

The TAS diagram

The names provided by Le Maitre et al. (2002) for fields in the TAS diagram are listed below.

B (Basalt) (Use normative mineralogy to subdivide)

O1 (Basaltic andesite)

O2 (Andesite)

O3 (Dacite)

R (Rhyolite)

T (Trachyte or Trachydacite) (Use normative mineralogy to decide)

Ph (Phonolite)

S1 (Trachybasalt) *Sodic and potassic variants are Hawaiite and Potassic Trachybasalt

S2 (Basaltic trachyandesite) *Sodic and potassic variants are Mugearite and Shoshonite

S3 (Trachyandesite *Sodic and potassic variants are Benmoreite and Latite

Pc (Picrobasalt)

U1 (Basanite or Tephrite) (Use normative mineralogy to decide)

U2 (Phonotephrite)

U3 (Tephriphonolite)

F (Foidite) (Name according to dominant feldspathoid when possible. Melilitites also plot in this area and can be distinguished by additional chemical criteria.)

Sodic as used above means that Na2O - 2 is greater than K2O, and potassic that Na2O - 2 is less than K2O. Yet other names have been applied to rocks particularly rich in either sodium or potassium (as are ultrapotassic igneous rocks).

References
Albert Johannsen, A Descriptive Petrography of the Igneous Rocks. Volume 1, Introduction, Textures, Classifications, and Glossary. The University of Chicago Press, Chicago, Illinois, 1937.
R. W. Le Maitre (editor), A. Streckeisen, B. Zanettin, M. J. Le Bas, B. Bonin, P. Bateman, G. Bellieni, A. Dudek, S. Efremova, J. Keller, J. Lamere, P. A. Sabine, R. Schmid, H. Sorensen, and A. R. Woolley, Igneous Rocks: A Classification and Glossary of Terms, Recommendations of the International Union of Geological Sciences, Subcommission of the Systematics of Igneous Rocks. Cambridge University Press, 2002. 

Igneous petrology
Igneous rocks